Thomas Rawlinson (1847 – 21 July 1928) was an English-born Australian politician.

Born in Kent to stonemason William Rawlinson and Eliza Underdown, he arrived in New South Wales with his family around 1852. He attended Sydney Grammar School and studied law at the University of Sydney, being admitted as a solicitor in 1870. He then moved to Bega, where he became partner in Rawlinson & Bland. On 14 November 1877 he married Sarah Ritchie, with whom he had eight children. In 1884 he was Bega's first mayor. He served as the Protectionist member for Bega from 1894 to 1895 in the New South Wales Legislative Assembly. Rawlinson died at Bellevue Hill in 1928.

References

 

1847 births
1928 deaths
Members of the New South Wales Legislative Assembly
Protectionist Party politicians